Cassida is a large Old World genus of tortoise beetles in the subfamily Cassidinae. The natural history of Cassida sphaerula in South Africa is a typical life cycle. Several species of Cassida are important agricultural pests, in particular C. vittata and C. nebulosa on sugar beet and spinach. The thistle tortoise beetle (Cassida rubiginosa) has been used as a biological control agent against Canada thistle.

There are at least 430 described species in Cassida. It is the genus in the subfamily Cassidinae which contains the most species.

See also
 List of Cassida species

References

Further reading

External links

 

Chrysomelidae genera
Cassidinae
Taxa named by Carl Linnaeus